Sealed Hearts is a 1919 American silent drama film directed by Ralph Ince and starring Eugene O'Brien, Robert Edeson, and Lucille Lee Stewart.

Cast
 Eugene O'Brien as Jack Prentiss 
 Robert Edeson as Frank Prentiss 
 Lucille Lee Stewart as Kate Gray 
 Jack Dean as Mr. Gray 
 Ethel Kingsley as Mrs. Gray 
 Frank Murdock as Fred Gray 
 Helen Reinecke as Helen Gray 
 William T. Hayes

References

Bibliography
 Monaco, James. The Encyclopedia of Film. Perigee Books, 1991.

External links

1919 films
1919 drama films
Silent American drama films
Films directed by Ralph Ince
American silent feature films
1910s English-language films
Selznick Pictures films
American black-and-white films
1910s American films